Goure Airport  is an airport serving Goure in Niger.

References

Airports in Niger